

Peerage of England 

|rowspan=2|Earl of Surrey (1088)||Isabel de Warenne, 4th Countess of Surrey||1148||1199||Died
|-
|William de Warenne, 5th Earl of Surrey||1199||1240|| 
|-
|Earl of Warwick (1088)||Waleran de Beaumont, 4th Earl of Warwick||1184||1203|| 
|-
|rowspan=2|Earl of Devon (1141)||Richard de Redvers, 4th Earl of Devon||1188||1193||Died
|-
|William de Redvers, 5th Earl of Devon||1193||1217|| 
|-
|rowspan=2|Earl of Leicester (1107)||Robert de Beaumont, 3rd Earl of Leicester||1168||1190||Died
|-
|Robert de Beaumont, 4th Earl of Leicester||1190||1204|| 
|-
|Earl of Chester (1121)||Ranulf de Blondeville, 6th Earl of Chester||1181||1232|| 
|-
|Earl of Hertford (1135)||Richard de Clare, 4th Earl of Hertford||1173||1217|| 
|-
|Earl of Richmond (1136)||Constance of Brittany||1171||1201|| 
|-
|rowspan=2|Earl of Arundel (1138)||William d'Aubigny, 2nd Earl of Arundel||1176||1193||Died
|-
|William d'Aubigny, 3rd Earl of Arundel||1193||1221|| 
|-
|rowspan=2|Earl of Derby (1138)||William de Ferrers, 3rd Earl of Derby||1162||1190||Died
|-
|William de Ferrers, 4th Earl of Derby||1190||1247|| 
|-
|Earl of Norfolk (1140)||Roger Bigod, 2nd Earl of Norfolk||1177||1221|| 
|-
|rowspan=2|Earl of Oxford (1142)||Aubrey de Vere, 1st Earl of Oxford||1142||1194||Died
|-
|Aubrey de Vere, 2nd Earl of Oxford||1194||1214|| 
|-
|rowspan=2|Earl of Salisbury (1145)||William of Salisbury, 2nd Earl of Salisbury||1168||1196||Died
|-
|William Longespée, 3rd Earl of Salisbury||1196||1226|| 
|-
|Earl of Gloucester (1186)||John of England||1189||1199||Merged in crown
|-
|Earl of Cornwall (1189)||John of England||1189||1199||Merged in crown
|-
|Earl of Pembroke (1189)||William Marshal, 1st Earl of Pembroke||1189||1219|| 
|-
|Earl of Essex (1199)||Geoffrey Fitzpeter, 1st Earl of Essex||1199||1213||New creation
|-
|Earl of Hereford (1199)||Henry de Bohun, 1st Earl of Hereford||1199||1220||New creation

Peerage of Scotland

|Earl of Mar (1114)||Gille Críst, Earl of Mar||Abt. 1178||Abt. 1220||
|-
|Earl of Dunbar (1115)||Patrick I, Earl of Dunbar||1182||1232||
|-
|rowspan=2|Earl of Angus (1115)||Adam, Earl of Angus||1187||1197||Died
|-
|Gille Críst, Earl of Angus||1197||Abr. 1210||
|-
|rowspan=2|Earl of Atholl (1115)||Máel Coluim, Earl of Atholl||Abt 1150||Abt 1190||Died
|-
|Henry, Earl of Atholl||Abt 1190||1210||
|-
|rowspan=3|Earl of Buchan (1115)||Roger, Earl of Buchan||Abt. 1180||Abt. 1190||Died
|-
|Fergus, Earl of Buchan||Abt. 1190||Abt. 1195||Died
|-
|Margaret, Countess of Buchan||Abt. 1195||Abt. 1243||
|-
|Earl of Strathearn (1115)||Gille Brigte, Earl of Strathearn||1171||1223||
|-
|Earl of Fife (1129)||Donnchad II, Earl of Fife||1154||1203||
|-
|rowspan=2|Earl of Menteith (1160)||Gille Críst, Earl of Menteith||Abt. 1160||Abt. 1190||Died
|-
|Muireadhach I, Earl of Menteith||Abt. 1190||Abt. 1213||
|-
|Earl of Lennox (1184)||Ailín I, Earl of Lennox||1184||1220||
|-
|Earl of Carrick (1184)||Donnchadh, Earl of Carrick||1186||1250||
|-
|}

Peerage of Ireland

|Baron Athenry (1172)||Robert de Bermingham||1172||1218||
|-
|}

References

 

Lists of peers by decade
1190s in England
12th century in Scotland
12th-century English people
12th-century mormaers
Peers